Buddhism in the Americas may refer to:

 North America:
 Buddhism in Canada
 Buddhism in Mexico
 Buddhism in the United States
 Buddhism in Central America
 Buddhism in Costa Rica
 Buddhism in Nicaragua
 South America:
 Buddhism in Brazil
 Buddhism in Argentina
 Buddhism in Colombia
 Buddhism in Ecuador
 Buddhism in Venezuela

See also 
 South America Hongwanji Mission
 Index of Buddhism-related articles
 Secular Buddhism

Americas
 
 
Religion in the Americas
Religion in North America
Religion in South America
Buddhism by country